Rajmohol (Bengali: রাজমহল) is a 2005 Indian Bengali-language horror drama film starring Prosenjit Chatterjee, Abhishek Chatterjee, Anu Choudhury, Rachana Banerjee, Biplab Chatterjee, Subhasish Mukherjee, and Bharat Kaul. It is a remake of the 1993 Malayalam film Manichitrathazhu. This movie has got 5 versions (four remakes) in total - 
Malayalam - Manichitrathazhu (original) and its remakes.
Kannada - Apthamitra,
Tamil- Chandramukhi,
Bengali - Rajmohol and
Hindi - Bhool Bhulaiyaa.

Plot
A married couple from Kolkata, Deboshree (Anu Choudhury) and her husband Sumit (Abhishek Chatterjee), move to a village. There, they move into a supposedly haunted mansion which belonged to Sumit's ancestors. Deboshree then goes into the restricted room and finds out that there was a dancer named Chandramukhi who had been killed by a zamindar (a Persian word meaning "landlord"), who lived in that mansion. After mysterious occurrences in the mansion, which appear paranormal, Sumit calls his psychologist friend Dr. Agni (Prosenjit Chatterjee) from USA, as he believes that there is not a ghost. He believes that Malini (Rachana Banerjee) who could not marry him is mentally ill and behind all those incidents. But Dr. Agni makes more comic misunderstandings. Also, Dr. Agni starts to like Malini.

In the climax, it is revealed that Deboshree suffers multiple personality disorder and because of her sympathy for Chandramukhi, she starts believing that she is Chandramukhi. She thinks that her husband is the cruel zamindar responsible for Chandramukhi's death, and she must take her revenge by killing him. Dr. Agni devises a plan and makes Deboshree 'kill' a doll instead of Sumit. Thinking she has killed Sumit and exacted her revenge, the personality of Chandramukhi 'leaves' Deboshree. At the end of the movie, a hypnotized Deboshree regains consciousness as her usual self. And Dr. Agni marries Malini.

Cast
 Prosenjit Chatterjee as Dr. Agni
 Abhishek Chatterjee as Sumit
 Anu Choudhury as Deboshree, Sumit's wife
 Rachana Banerjee as Malini, Agni's love interest
 Subhasish Mukherjee as Manik, Malini's maternal uncle
 Biplab Chatterjee as Manohar Choudhury, Malini's father
 Bharat Kaul
 Rita Koiral
 Dulal Lahiri as Tarapith Maharaj

Soundtrack

Music of Rajmohol has been composed by Ashok Bhadra. Lyrics of the album were penned by Gautam Susmit. Kumar Sanu, Udit Narayan, Kavita Krishnamurthy, Anuradha Paudwal, Miss Jojo has given their voices for the album.

References

External links
 

2005 films
Bengali-language Indian films
Bengali remakes of Malayalam films
2000s Bengali-language films
2000s horror drama films
Films set in country houses
Indian psychological thriller films

Indian horror drama films
2005 psychological thriller films